The 1984 Virginia Slims of Denver was a women's tennis tournament played on indoor hard courts in Denver, Colorado in the United States that was part of the 1984 Virginia Slims World Championship Series. The tournament was held from January 16 through January 22, 1984. Mary-Lou Daniels won the singles title.

Finals

Singles
 Mary-Lou Daniels defeated  Kim Sands 6–1, 6–1
 It was Daniels' 1st title of the year and the 4th of her career.

Doubles
 Marcella Mesker /  Anne Hobbs defeated  Sherry Acker /  Candy Reynolds 6–2, 6–3
 It was Mesker's 1st title of the year and the 3rd of her career. It was Hobbs' 1st title of the year and the 7th of her career.

External links
 ITF tournament edition details

Virginia Slims of Denver
Virginia Slims of Denver
Virginia Slims of Denver
Virginia Slims of Denver
Virginia Slims of Denver